Ticktown may refer to:

Ticktown, a former name of Jeffersonville, Kentucky
Ticktown, Virginia, an unincorporated community